Sándor Dallos (1901-1964) was a Hungarian writer. In 1953 he received the Attila József Prize.  Two of his books placed in the Top 100 of the Hungarian version of the BBC Big Read.

References 

1901 births
1964 deaths
Attila József Prize recipients